Cambuslang  (from ) is a town on the south-eastern outskirts of Greater Glasgow, Scotland. With approximately 30,000 residents, it is the 27th largest town in Scotland by population, although, never having had a town hall, it may also be considered the largest village in Scotland. It is within the local authority area of South Lanarkshire and directly borders the town of Rutherglen to the west. Historically, it was a large civil parish incorporating the nearby hamlets of Newton, Flemington, Westburn and Halfway.

It has a long history of coal mining, from at least 1490, iron and steel making, and ancillary engineering works, most recently The Hoover Company (in the town from 1946 to 2005). The Clydebridge Steelworks and other smaller manufacturing businesses continue but most employment in the area comes from the distribution or service industries. The headquarters of the Scottish Fire and Rescue Service is in Cambuslang.

History

The local geography of Cambuslang explains a great deal of its history. It has been very prosperous over time, depending first upon its agricultural land, (supplying food, then wool, then linen), then the mineral resources under its soil (limestone and coal, and, to some extent, iron). These were jealously guarded by the medieval Church, and later by the local aristocracy, particularly the Duke of Hamilton (previously Barons of Cadzow and Earls of Arran).

Because of its relative prosperity, Cambuslang has been intimately concerned in the politics of the country (through the Hamilton connection) and of the local Church. Bishop John Cameron of Glasgow, and Cardinal Beaton,  were both Rectors of Cambuslang. This importance continued following the Protestant Reformation. From then until the Glorious Revolution a stream of Ministers of Cambuslang came, were expelled, or were re-instated, according to whether supporters of the King, Covenanters, or Oliver Cromwell were in power. The religious movements of the 18th century, including the Cambuslang Wark, were directly linked to similar movements in North America. The Scottish Enlightenment was well represented in the person of Rev Dr James Meek, the Minister. His troubles with his parishioners foreshadowed the split in the Church of Scotland during the 19th century.

The manufacturing industries that grew up from the agricultural and mineral resources attracted immigrants from all over Scotland and Ireland and other European countries. Cambuslang benefited at all times from its closeness to the burgeoning city of Glasgow, brought closer in the 18th century by a turnpike road then, in the 19th century, by a railway. In the 21st century, it continues to derive benefit from its proximity to Glasgow and to wider communication networks, particularly via the M74 motorway system. Its increasing (and increasingly diverse) population posed problems, over the centuries, of employment and housing as well as of schooling and health, not all of which have been solved; in this regard, it is fairly typical of most Scottish towns.

In sport, Cambuslang F.C. were founder members of the Scottish Football League whose most notable achievement was being the runners-up in the 1887–88 Scottish Cup. They folded by the early 20th century, as did Scottish Junior Cup winners Cambuslang Hibernian, but a new team Cambuslang Rangers F.C. was established and continues to this day – they enjoyed great success in the 1970s.

Governance

Westminster
Cambuslang is in the Rutherglen and Hamilton West Constituency for elections to the House of Commons at Westminster.

Gerard Killen won the seat for the Scottish Labour and Co-operative Party in the June 2017 election, replacing Margaret Ferrier of the Scottish National Party who had won in 2015. In the 2019 election, Ferrier re-gained the seat; following until an incident relating to a breach of the COVID-19 pandemic regulations in October 2020, the SNP whip was withdrawn and she ignored calls to resign, continuing in office as an independent.

Holyrood
Cambuslang was originally in the Glasgow Rutherglen Constituency for the Scottish Parliament at Holyrood. In 2011 the boundaries were redrawn and the new constituency renamed simply Rutherglen, despite its boundaries taking in not only Cambuslang but also Blantyre.

In the 2016 elections, Clare Haughey won the seat for the SNP with 15,222 votes, giving a majority of 11.4%, replacing James Kelly who had been elected both in 2007 and 2011. Kelly remained in the Parliament as a 'list member' elected on a regional proportional representation basis.

South Lanarkshire Council
Administratively, the town centre is within the Cambuslang West ward of South Lanarkshire Council, which has a population of around 15,000. Taking another ward encompassing the eastern parts of the town into consideration, its overall population was approximately 30,000 in 2016. With neighbouring Rutherglen's figures being very similar, the many services and amenities shared between the towns should provide for 60,000 residents, many assessed as living in economic hardship.

South Lanarkshire Council election results detailing local wards: 1995, 1999; 2003; 2007; 2012; 2017.

Geography

Cambuslang is located on a lengthy bend on the River Clyde, south-east of Glasgow. The town is accessible from the nearby M74; the nearby A724 links to Glasgow city centre and Hamilton; the town is also accessible by car from East Kilbride by the A725, A749 and then the B759. The town's railway station, Cambuslang, lies on the Argyle Line between central Glasgow and Lanark.

The Reverend Dr John Robertson, Minister of Cambuslang Kirk, described the Parish in the Second Statistical Account of Scotland 1845. "It is bounded by the Clyde on the north, which separates it from the Parish of Old Monkland; by the Calder on the east, which separates it from Blantyre; by part of Blantyre and Kilbryde, on the south; and by Carmunnock and Rutherglen on the west." The highest points in this low-lying Parish are Dechmont Hill (602 ft) and Turnlaw (or Turnlea) Hill (553 ft.) There are remains of an Iron Age fort on Dechmont.

Landmarks

Cambuslang has an interesting range of churches, public buildings, schools, industrial and commercial buildings (see Buildings of Cambuslang). Its domestic buildings range from 19th-century mansions, villas and tenements to modern flats and detached houses, along with sheltered and nursing homes.

Sites
Cambuslang Park spans  encompassing the contrast of open parkland and the Borgie Glen, which is a steep tree-lined ravine, containing a complex network of pathways. The park also features a pond, sports pitches, war memorial (depicting a soldier in a kilt), woodland areas and the Bandstand, which is a natural amphitheatre, near where the famous Cambuslang Wark took place in the 18th century.

Education
There is a range of schools in Cambuslang, and a history of further education colleges, although there are no longer any in the town.

Primary schools
Primary schools (2022–23 pupil roll in parentheses: 
Cairns Primary School (333)
Hallside Primary School (254)
James Aiton Primary School (148)
Newton Farm Primary School (639)
Park View Primary School (206)
St Bride's Primary School (273)
St Cadoc's Primary School (140)
St Charles' Primary School (350)
West Coats Primary School (409)

Secondary schools
Cathkin High School (1006)
Trinity High School (1186)
Rutherglen High School (additional support needs) (110)

Some parts of Cambuslang are within the catchment area of Stonelaw High School, which is situated in Rutherglen, the adjoining town. Uddingston Grammar School, one train stop from Cambuslang on the Motherwell via Bellshill line, includes Newton Farm Primary in its catchment.

Colleges

Cambuslang College of the Building Trades was a specialist college established in the mid-twentieth century but it gradually expanded to teach other trades and academic subjects. It became Cambuslang College of Further Education in the 1960s, and went on to open a campus in East Kilbride, as well as facilities in Hamilton and Wishaw. A substantial annexe remained in Cambuslang on Hamilton Road, by now located in the former Gateside School. Reflecting its wider geographical coverage, it became South Lanarkshire College in 2000. In 2008, the Cambuslang campus closed and all South Lanarkshire College facilities were moved to a new, custom-built campus in East Kilbride.

As well as hosting the headquarters of the Scottish Fire and Rescue Service, the Scottish national training centre for firefighters is based in Cambuslang (having previously been located in Gullane, East Lothian).

Early schools in Cambuslang
There has been a Parish school in Cambuslang at least since the Reformation, and probably before that. The schoolteacher was appointed and paid by the heritors, though he also charged fees. Free primary education came with the Education Act for Scotland (1871). 

The original Cambuslang Public School can be seen on Greenlees Road, where it is now Greenlees Care Home. It had been for some time the Cambuslang College of the Building Trades, which became part of Cambuslang College (now South Lanarkshire College ). An even earlier school is now a Gospel Hall in Bushiehill Street.
 
The Cambuslang Subscription School of 1848 provided basic education to the children of miners and weavers in return for a few coppers. It was attractive to those who did not like the influence of the gentry and the minister on the parish school.

Transport
 There are three railway stations within the boundaries of Cambuslang - Cambuslang itself, on the Argyle Line section of the West Coast Main Line, Kirkhill on the Newton branch of the Cathcart Circle, and Newton, which is situated at a junction serving all of the aforementioned lines. Several bus routes pass through Cambuslang, with First Bus Glasgow currently operating most services between Lanarkshire and Glasgow. Several private hire taxi firms currently operate out of Cambuslang too.

National Cycle Route 75 passes through Cambuslang and extensive cycle lanes were added to the Main Street (A724) in 2016, although these were to prove controversial.

Notable natives/residents

Cadoc
St Cadoc (c 497 – c 580), also called "Cadow" or "Cattwg", reputedly founded a monastery on the site of the present Old Parish Church in the later sixth century. He is the patron saint of Cambuslang, where there is a modern primary school named after him. His feast day is 25 September. In medieval times, Cadoc was called on for help by (among others) deaf people and those suffering from cramp.

He was a Celtic saint – previously, a Prince of Glamorgan – who brought succour to the native Christians against the invading Saxons. Cambuslang is at the northernmost reach of the Welsh speaking Brythons, so he may well have visited here in his wanderings, or in an effort to secure help against the Saxons. He had travelled to Ireland, to Brittany (to visit the Welsh-speaking monks there), Rome (the centre of Western Christianity) and Jerusalem (from where he brought back two altar stones that had touched the Holy Sepulchre.

The Europe he walked through was being battered by the barbarian invasions, so it is not improbable that he managed to reach Cambuslang. However, as no mention is made in the legends of an expedition this far north, it might have been a disciple, or a pilgrim returning from Glamorgan with a relic, who established the church at Cambuslang. Cadoc was cut down, while serving Mass, by a Saxon raiding party at "Benevenna", most probably near Weedon Bec, Northamptonshire.

St Cadoc was prestigious enough in his lifetime for local chiefs to have recourse to him to settle disputes. This reputation lasted well into the Middle Ages, where solemn bonds and oaths were sworn over his (or his followers') remains. Just before the Reformation, a wealthy Cambuslang notable expressed in his will a desire to be interred "with the ashes of St Cadoc", in the Parish Kirk.

David Dale
David Dale (1739–1806) was a Scottish industrialist and philanthropist. His efforts to establish a cotton-spinning factory at Flemington failed but he was very successful as co-founder of the New Lanark Mills in 1786. Dale owned the estate of Rosebank in Cambuslang, which he used as a summer retreat from his townhouse (reputedly still standing) in Charlotte Street Glasgow and to where he retired and lived until his death. The estate was sold after his death to the Caledonian Railway Company, which divided it in two to accommodate the new railway. The half to the north of the railway line, including Rosebank House, eventually became Rosebank Industrial Estate. The southern half was sold to Thomas Gray Buchanan, a Glasgow merchant, related to the Buchanan who established Buchanan Street in Glasgow, who established a country retreat at Wellshott House, but his son Michael sold off the lands to build suburban villas in the 1860s.

James Meek
Rev Dr James Meek (1739–1810) was Minister of Cambuslang from 1774 until his death. He had been Dean of the Chapel at Glasgow University, when the Rector was Edmund Burke and the professors included the philosopher Thomas Reid. He was Moderator of the General Assembly of the Church of Scotland in 1795. He wrote the entry for Cambuslang in the First Statistical Account of Scotland. The cool, objective account in his report of the Cambuslang Wark remains the prime historical source for that event. He kept a detailed "Journal and Register of the Weather..." for each day over 29 years, with remarks on weather and events throughout Britain and the world. This Journal is still quoted in modern histories of the weather. He is buried in the Old Parish Church kirkyard, just inside the gate.

Other notable persons 

 David Beaton (c. 1494–1546) was Rector of Cambuslang from 1520. He was appointed to this post by his uncle, James Beaton, Archbishop of Glasgow, and was a prebendary, which means he lived off the tithes and never lived there, leaving the work of a parish priest to a vicar.
 Claudius Buchanan (1766–1815),  Scottish theologian, an ordained minister of the Church of England, and an evangelical missionary to India. 
 Sir George Burns (1795–1890), shipping magnate and co-founder of the Cunard Line resided at Rosebank House.
 Robert Crawford (1959–), Scottish poet and Professor of Modern Scottish Literature at St Andrews University, and wrote a poem called "Cambuslang".
 William de Cambuslang (died 1361), Bishop of Dunblane (1347–1361). 
 John Dunlop (1755–1820), one-time Lord Provost of Glasgow resided at Rosebank House.
 John Colin Dunlop (1785–1842), historian and son of John Dunlop, also lived at Rosebank House.
 Robert Fleming the elder (1630–1694), Presbyterian minister at Cambuslang and Rotterdam.
 Sammy Gilmore (1939–2011), shipyard trade-unionist; most notably a leader of the Upper Clyde Shipbuilders work-in in 1971.
 Duncan Munro Glen (1933–2008), prolific poet and historian, Emeritus Professor of Visual Communication at Nottingham Trent University.
 William Hamilton of Gilbertfield (1665–1751), wrote a metrical abridgement, in 18th-century Scots, of Blind Harry's poem The Actes and Deidis of the Illustre and Vallyeant Campioun Schir William Wallace on Sir William Wallace, whose 17th-century castle remains, though in ruins. He corresponded with Allan Ramsay and his poetry was praised in an epistle by Robert Burns – where he referred to him as "Gilbertfield".
 Scott Harrison (1977–), World Boxing Organisation featherweight champion for 2002.
 John Claudius Loudon (1783–1843), a famous gardener (or rather "horticultural writer, dendrologist and designer"), wrote the Encyclopaedia of Gardening (1822), and invented a flexible iron-bar sash which made possible such monumental greenhouses as the Palm House at Kew Gardens and the Crystal Palace. 
 Jimmy Jackson (1875–c. 1914), Scottish-Australian footballer. 
 Robin Jenkins (1912–2005), novelist. 

 Sir Thomas Lipton (1850–1931) of tea fame lived in the Johnstone Villa in Cambuslang, which was named after his mother's family. 
 J. B. Lockhart FRSE (1886-1969) mathematician and educator. 
 The Rt Rev David Lunan (1944–), Moderator of the General Assembly of the Church of Scotland (effective 2008).
 Mick McGahey (1925–1999), miners' leader.
 Sir Ian Alexander McGregor (1922–2007), malariologist who led British research in tropical medicine at the MRC Laboratories in the Gambia.
 John McWhan FRSE (1885–1943), mathematician and educator
 Dr David Forbes Martyn (1906–1970), physicist and radiographer, contributing to the development of coastal and air defence radar for Australia during World War II. 
 Brendan O'Hare (1970–), musician.
 Dorothy Carleton Smyth (1880–1933), Scottish artist and an active supporter of the Woman's Suffrage Campaign.  
 Martin Stepek (1959–), writer. 
 Midge Ure (1953–), pop-singer and anti-hunger campaigner (Band Aid and Live 8).
 Air Vice-Marshal John B. Wallace, Deputy Director-General of Medical Services, Royal Air Force from 1961-66.
 Mike Watson (1949–), previously a Labour life peer as Lord Watson of Invergowrie, was given a 16-month prison sentence in 2005 for wilful fire-raising. Though born in Cambuslang in 1949, Watson moved early to Invergowrie near Dundee.
 Robert Wilson (1907–1964), opera and concert singer (D'Oyly Carte Opera Company) and recording artist (Parlophone and HMV).

See also
Routes To Work South

References

Bibliography
 Glen, Duncan A nation in a parish: A new historical prospect of Scotland from the parish of Cambuslang AKROS Publications Kirkcaldy (1995) 
 Glen, Duncan Munro New History of Cambuslang AKROS Publications Kirkcaldy (1998) 

 Groome, Francis H. (1903). Ordnance Gazetteer of Scotland: A Survey of Scottish Topography, Statistical, Biographical and Historical, 

 Magnusson, Magnus (1990). Chambers Biographical Dictionary W & R Chambers Ltd 

 Williamson, Elizabeth; Riches, Anne; Higgs, Malcolm (1990). The Buildings of Scotland – Glasgow. Penguin Books. .
 Wilson, James Alexander OBE, MD A History of Cambuslang: a Clydesdale parish. Jackson Wylie & Co Glasgow (1929)

External links

 Views of Old Cambuslang
 Historical perspective for Cambuslang, from the Gazetteer for Scotland* The Statistical Accounts of Scotland
 for an extract on Cambuslang from Rambles Round Glasgow by Hugh MacLelland

 
Towns in South Lanarkshire
Civil parishes of Scotland
Mining communities in Scotland